Muqtadir Nimji (born 8 September 1999 in Nairobi) is a Kenyan professional squash player. As of July 2022, he was ranked number 494 in the world. He is the Kenyan number 1, and represents Kenya in international competitions.

References

1999 births
Living people
Kenyan male squash players